Hui-Ying Liu-Tawaststjerna (劉慧瑛; born Taipei, 19 October 1950) is a Taiwan-born pianist resident in Finland. She has been a lecturer on piano performance at Sibelius Academy since 1985.

References

Finnish pianists
Finnish women pianists
Taiwanese pianists
1950 births
Living people
21st-century pianists
21st-century women pianists